Saagar K Chandra (born Kala Sagar)  is an Indian film director and screenwriter who predominantly works in Telugu cinema. He made his directorial debut film in 2012 with Ayyare. He then directed Appatlo Okadundevadu (2016) and Bheemla Nayak (2022).

Personal life 

Chandra hails from Nalgonda district in present-day Telangana. He was born to Rama Chandra Reddy and Sunitha. Saagar's birthname was Kala Sagar but he changed his name to Saagar K Chandra to suffix his father's name. He has a sister, Gauthami. He did his schooling in Nalgonda and graduated from Vasavi College of Engineering in Hyderabad, and later moved to the United States to pursue his Masters. In 2017, he married Geetha Reddy.

Film career 
He left his job in the US and moved back to Hyderabad in 2009 to pursue his career in films. He faced resistance from his family when he conveyed his interest in films, as he does not have a film background. He worked as assistant director with director Ravi Babu for his film Amaravathi (2009). He also worked with Madhura Sreedhar in direction department. His first film as a director is Ayyare which got critical acclaim. Later he directed Appatlo Okadundevadu. This film also got critical acclaim and a commercial success as well.

In 2022, he directed the Telugu remake of Ayyappanum Koshiyum titled Bheemla Nayak, starring Pawan Kalyan, Rana Daggubati and Nithya Menen under Sithara Entertainments banner.

Filmography

Notes

References

External links 
 

Indian film directors
Telugu film directors
1985 births
Living people
Nandi Award winners
Film directors from Telangana
21st-century Indian film directors
People from Nalgonda district
Indian screenwriters
Telugu screenwriters
Screenwriters from Telangana